Phreatodrobia is a genus of very small or minute freshwater snails with a gill and an operculum, aquatic gastropod mollusks in the family Lithoglyphidae.

The generic name Phreatodrobia is derived from the Greek word "phreatos" which means ground water, as in phreatic, and from the suffix -drobia based on family name Hydrobiidae (where it was originally classified), which means "living in water".

Species
Species within the genus Phreatodrobia include:
 Phreatodrobia conica Hershler & Longley, 1986
 Phreatodrobia coronae Hershler, 1987<ref name="Hershler 1987">Hershler & Longley (1987). "Phreatodrobia coronae, a New Species of Cave Snail from Southwestern Texas". The Nautilus 101(3): 133-139.</ref>
 Phreatodrobia imitata Hershler & Longley, 1986 - mimic cavesnail
 Phreatodrobia micra (Pilsbry & Ferriss, 1906) - type species
 Phreatodrobia nugax (Pilsbry & Ferriss, 1906)
 Phreatodrobia nugax inclinata Hershler & Longley, 1986
 Phreatodrobia plana Hershler & Longley, 1986
 Phreatodrobia punctata Hershler & Longley, 1986
 Phreatodrobia rotunda'' Hershler & Longley, 1986

References

Lithoglyphidae
Taxonomy articles created by Polbot